Rathkea is a genus of cnidarians belonging to the family Rathkeidae.

The species of this genus are found in Europe, Northern Russia and Northern America.

Species:

Rathkea africana 
Rathkea antarctica 
Rathkea formosissima 
Rathkea hyalina 
Rathkea lizzioides 
Rathkea octopunctata 
Rathkea rubence

References

Rathkeidae
Hydrozoan genera